Washington's 27th legislative district is one of forty-nine districts in Washington state for representation in the state legislature. 

The district includes most of northern Tacoma. 

The district's legislators are state senator Yasmin Trudeau and state representatives Laurie Jinkins (position 1) and Jake Fey (position 2), all Democrats. Jinkins is the current Speaker of the House.

See also
Washington Redistricting Commission
Washington State Legislature
Washington State Senate
Washington House of Representatives

References

External links
Washington State Redistricting Commission
Washington House of Representatives
Map of Legislative Districts

27